The Frontier Pathways is a  National Scenic Byway and Colorado Scenic and Historic Byway located in Custer and Pueblo counties, Colorado, US.

Route

Gallery

See also

History Colorado
List of scenic byways in Colorado
Scenic byways in the United States

Notes

References

External links

America's Byways
America's Scenic Byways: Colorado
Colorado Department of Transportation
Colorado Scenic & Historic Byways Commission
Colorado Scenic & Historic Byways
Colorado Travel Map
Colorado Tourism Office
History Colorado

Colorado Scenic and Historic Byways
National Scenic Byways
National Scenic Byways in Colorado
San Isabel National Forest
Transportation in Colorado
Transportation in Custer County, Colorado
Transportation in Pueblo County, Colorado
Tourist attractions in Colorado
Tourist attractions in Custer County, Colorado
Tourist attractions in Pueblo County, Colorado
Interstate 25